Chelidae is one of three living families of the turtle suborder Pleurodira, and are commonly called Austro-South American side-neck turtles. The family is distributed in Australia, New Guinea, parts of Indonesia, and throughout most of South America. It is a large family of turtles with a significant fossil history dating back to the Cretaceous. The family is entirely Gondwanan in origin, with no members found outside Gondwana, either in the present day or as a fossil.

Description

Like all pleurodirous turtles, the chelids withdraw their necks sideways into their shells, differing from cryptodires that fold their necks in the vertical plane. They are all highly aquatic species with webbed feet and the capacity to stay submerged for long periods of time. The snake-necked species (genera Chelus, Chelodina, and Hydromedusa) are largely strike-and-gape hunters or foragers feeding on fish, invertebrates, and gastropods. The short-necked forms are largely herbivorous or molluscivorous, but are also opportunistic, with several species having specialized to eating fruits.

The highly aquatic nature of the group is typified by the presence of cloacal breathing in some species of the genera Elseya and Rheodytes. However, some species, such as the eastern long-neck turtle (Chelodina longicollis) from Australia spend significant periods of time on land and are considered highly terrestrial.

The smaller members of the family include the Macleay River turtle (Emydura macquarii) at around 16 cm, twist-necked turtle (Platemys platycephala) at 18 cm and the western swamp turtle (Pseudemydura umbrina) at 15 cm, whereas the larger species such as the mata mata (Chelus fimbriata) and the white-throated snapping turtle (Elseya albagula) both exceed 45 cm in shell length.

Chelids exhibit XX/XY genetic sex determination, in contrast to most other turtles, which have temperature-dependent sex determination.

Shell morphology

Members of Chelidae have unique shell morphology. The carapace often has reduced surface exposure of neural bones, or even none at all. This is due to less requirement for enlarged longissimus dorsi muscles in side-necked turtles.

The inside of the carapace is often heavily buttressed. This has sometimes been seen as a defense mechanism, that is it increases the strength of the shell against biting force, however Thomson (2003) demonstrated it is linked to feeding methods and the prevention of internal torsion of the shell. Chelids also lack mesoplastra, which separates them from the Pelomedusidae.

The cervical scute is usually present, though it is absent in some species of Elseya and Myuchelys. Otherwise, the carapace has the usual complement of four costals, five vertebrals and twelve marginals (per side). Internally, the carapace is made of eight pleurals (per side), eleven peripherals (per side), a nuchal at the front and a suprapygal and pygal at the rear of the shell. As noted earlier, neurals, although always present, often exist as subsurface elements above the vertebral column.

The plastron of chelids does not contain any hinges as can appear in some cryptodire turtles. The scute pattern is a unique feature of the Pleurodira and can be used to immediately identify a shell as belonging to this suborder. All cryptodires have 12 plastral scutes, whereas pleurodires have thirteen. The extra scute is called the intergular. The rest of the scutes and the skeletal structure beneath them are the same as all turtles: paired gulars, humerals, pectorals, abdominals, and anals. The skeletal elements consist of a single entoplaston, as well as paired epiplastra, entoplastra, hyoplastra, hypoplastra and xiphiplastra (Pritchard & Trebbau, 1984).

Evolutionary history 
The oldest records of Pan-Chelidae (the clade containing Chelidae and all other species more closely related to Chelidae than other pleurodires) first appear in the mid Cretaceous in South America and Australia, represented by Prochelidella cerrobarcinae from the Cerro Barcino Formation of Argentina, which dates from 118 to 110 million years ago, and indeterminate remains from the Griman Creek Formation, of New South Wales, Australia, dating to around 100 million years ago.

Classification

A number of theories of the relationships within the large chelid family have been posited. Using shared derived characters, an early attempt in the 1970s used strict parsimony to determine the three long-necked genera (Chelodina, Chelus, and Hydromedusa) were each other's closest relatives. This was accepted for some time, but brought into scrutiny, because the major differences between the genera showed they all appeared to have evolved independently of each other, hinging on the fact that although they had long necks, how they used them and their structures were different.

A number of additional data sets were developed that used electrophoresis and nuclear and mtDNA analysis; these all agreed on the independent evolution of the three long-necked clades. This was culminated in a reanalysis of the morphological data which demonstrated the convergence of the clades on a sweep of distinctive features needed for their piscivorous diets, Thomson, 2000. The subfamilies within Chelidae show the monophyly of the majority of the South American species and all the Australian species, with the far more ancient Hydromedusa as sister taxon to both these other groups.

The family Chelidae contains about 60 species within around twenty genera:

Taxonomy after TTWG 2021
Stem-group taxa 
Genus †Bonapartemys Lapparent de Broin & de la Fuente, 2001 Bajo Barreal Formation, Argentina, Late Cretaceous (Cenomanian-Turonian)
Genus †Linderochelys de la Fuente et al., 2007 Río Neuquén Subgroup, Argentina, Late Cretaceous (Turonian-Coniacian)
Genus †Lomalatachelys Lapparent de Broin & de la Fuente 2001  Bajo de la Carpa Formation, Argentina, Late Cretaceous (Santonian)
Genus †Palaeophrynops Lapparent de Broin & de la Fuente 2001 Los Alamitos Formation, Argentina, Late Cretaceous  (late Campanian -lower Maastrichtian)
Genus †Prochelidella Lapparent de Broin & de la Fuente 2001 Cerro Barcino Formation, Argentina, Early Cretaceous (Aptian-Albian) Candeleros Formation, Argentina, Cenomanian Bajo Barreal Formation, Argentina, Cenomanian-Turonian Portezuelo Formation, late Turonian – early Coniacian
Genus †Salamanchelys Bona, 2006 Salamanca Formation, Argentina, Paleocene (Danian)
Genus †Parahydraspis Wieland 1923 Ituzaingó Formation, Argentina, Miocene (Huayquerian)
 Family Chelidae Gray, 1831 (Crown group)
 Subfamily Chelodininae Baur 1893
 Genus †Birlimarr Megirian & Murray 1999 Camfield Beds, Northern Territory, Australia, Middle Miocene
 Genus Chelodina Fitzinger 1826 – Australian snake-necked turtles
 Genus Elseya Gray 1867 – Australian snapping turtles
 Genus Emydura Bonaparte 1836 – Australian short-necked turtles
 Genus Elusor, Cann & Legler, 1994 – Mary River turtle
 Genus Flaviemys Le et al., 2013 yellow-faced saw-shelled turtles
 Genus Myuchelys Thomson & Georges 2009 – Australian saw-shelled turtles
 Genus Rheodytes Legler & Cann, 1980 – Fitzroy River turtles
 Subfamily Chelinae Gray, 1825
 Genus Chelus Duméril 1806 – matamata turtles
 Genus Acanthochelys Gray, 1873 – South American side-necked swamp turtles
 Genus Mesoclemmys – including gibba turtle
 Genus Phrynops – toad-headed turtles
 Genus Platemys Wagner 1830 – twist-necked turtles
 Genus Ranacephala McCord, Joseph-Ouni & Lamar 2001 – Hoge's side-necked turtle 
 Genus Rhinemys – red-headed side-necked turtle
 Subfamily Hydromedusinae Baur, 1893
 Genus Hydromedusa Wagler 1830 – South American snake-necked turtles
 Genus †Yaminuechelys de la Fuente et al. 2001 Anacleto Formation, Argentina, Santonian-Campanian La Colonia Formation, Allen Formation, Los Alamitos Formation, Argentina, Campanian-Maastrichtian, Salamanca Formation, Roca Formation, Argentina, Paleocene (Danian)
 Subfamily Pseudemydurinae Zhang et al., 2017
 Genus Pseudemydura Siebenrock 1901 – western swamp tortoise

Phylogeny

Relationships of the living forms based on Georges et al., 2014.

The species in the Chelidae family are distributed across Australia, New Guinea, and South America. Over time they were required to disperse out of concerns of food shortage, habitat destruction, and weather disruptions. In all of these warmer climates, they can be found in turbid waters covered by muck and the root-mats of underwater vegetation. The waters that they are found in often lack large species of fish that would put them at risk of predation.

References

External links and further reading

 Chelidae
 Gondwanan turtle site

 
Taxa named by John Edward Gray
Turtle families
Extant Albian first appearances